Asylum is a 2003 American short documentary film directed by Sandy McLeod. It was nominated for an Academy Award for Best Documentary Short.

Overview
A young Ghanaian woman seeks refugee status in the U.S. when her father attempts to force her to marry against her will, and undergo female genital mutilation.

References

External links

Watch Asylum at Culture Unplugged

2003 films
2003 short documentary films
2000s English-language films
2003 independent films
American short documentary films
American independent films
Documentaries about weddings
Documentary films about refugees
Documentary films about immigration to the United States
Documentary films about violence against women
Works about female genital mutilation
Violence against women in Ghana
Forced marriage
Human rights in Ghana
2000s American films